Pugritsa is a village in Valga Parish, Valga County, in southeastern Estonia. It is located about 10 km southeast of the town of Valga, it also borders Latvia on its southwestern side. Pugritsa has a population of 40 (as of 1 January 2004).

References

Villages in Valga County